The 2004–05 Serie A (known as the Serie A TIM for sponsorship reasons) was the 103rd season of top-tier Italian football, the 73rd in a round-robin tournament. It was expanded to contain 20 clubs, which played 38 matches against each other, rather than the 34 matches in previous seasons, while relegations were reduced to three. The Coppa Campioni d'Italia was presented to the winners on the pitch for the first time.

The first two teams qualified directly to UEFA Champions League, teams ending in the third and fourth places had to play Champions League qualifications, teams ending in the fifth and sixth places qualified to UEFA Cup (another spot was given to the winner of Coppa Italia), while only the last three teams were to be relegated in Serie B, the Italian second division, following a regulations change.

Juventus finished as champions; however, they were later stripped of the title due to their involvement in the Calciopoli scandal. Runners-up Milan were also implicated in the scandal and that season's title was not awarded to any club. Udinese qualified for the UEFA Champions League for the first time in its history. Palermo, in its first Serie A campaign in over 30 years, finished in sixth place, qualifying for the UEFA Cup for the first time in its history. Roma qualified for the UEFA Cup as the runners-up in the Coppa Italia because the cup winner, Internazionale, had already qualified for the Champions League.

Two teams, Brescia and Atalanta, were directly relegated to Serie B, while the third relegation place was to be decided among three teams (Fiorentina, Bologna and Parma), counting only the so-called classifica avulsa; that is, the table composed solely by the six matches between the three teams. Bologna and Parma had fewer points, and played the relegation tiebreaker. The tiebreaker was won by Parma, who were defeated 0–1 at home but won 0–2 away in the return match. This method of classifying teams on equal points totals was abolished for the 2005–06 season but returned for the 2022–23 season.

Personnel and sponsoring

(*) Promoted from Serie B.

League table

Results

Relegation tie-breaker

Bologna relegated to Serie B.

Top goalscorers

Number of teams by region

References and sources

Almanacco Illustrato del Calcio 2006, Panini Edizioni, Modena, November 2006

External links
  - All results on RSSSF Website.
 2004/2005 Serie A Squads - (www.footballsquads.com)

Serie A seasons
Italy
1